Megachile reepeni is a species of bee in the family Megachilidae. It was described by Friese in 1918.

References

Reepeni
Insects described in 1918